John Vaughan  (1856 – 1935) was a Welsh international footballer. He was part of the Wales national football team between 1879 and 1884, playing 11 matches and scoring 2 goals. He played his first match on 7 April 1879 against Scotland and his last match on 17 March 1884 against England. At club level, he played for Druids.

See also
 List of Wales international footballers (alphabetical)

References

1856 births
1935 deaths
Welsh footballers
Wales international footballers
Druids F.C. players
Place of birth missing
Date of death missing
Association footballers not categorized by position